Tor Lian (13 June 1945 – 14 July 2016) was a Norwegian sports official.

Lian was the president of the Norwegian Handball Federation from 1985 to 1999 and the European Handball Federation from 2004 to 2012. He was the vice president of the Norwegian Olympic Committee from 1990 to 1996 and board member of the Norwegian Confederation of Sports from 1991 to 1996. He became an honorary member of the Norwegian Confederation of Sports in 2010. He died in July 2016.

References

1945 births
2016 deaths
Norwegian sports executives and administrators
Handball in Norway